The dimorphic dwarf kingfisher (Ceyx margarethae) is a species of bird in the family Alcedinidae that is endemic to the central and southern Philippines. Its natural habitat is subtropical or tropical moist lowland forests.

The species is small and have three toes on its legs. They fly with bullet-like speed to catch insects and grubs which they find on the ground.

Habitat 
Its natural habitat is subtropical or tropical moist lowland forests. To be precise, it inhabits islands such as Murcia, Negros, Cebu, Camiguin Sur, Mindanao and many other small islands in the central and southern Philippines (including Mt. Kanlaon). The species do vary from their cousin species such as indigo-banded and southern silvery kingfishers in a way that they do not fish for food when in water, and use it only to clean their feathers.

This species was formerly considered as one of the 15 recognised subspecies of what was then known as the variable dwarf kingfisher (Ceyx lepidus or Alcedo lepidus). A molecular phylogenetic study published in 2013 found that most of the insular subspecies had substantially diverged from one another. The variable dwarf kingfisher was therefore split and 12 of the subspecies, including the dimorphic dwarf kingfisher, were promoted to species status. At the same time the name of the variable dwarf kingfisher was changed to the Moluccan dwarf kingfisher.

References

dimorphic dwarf kingfisher
Endemic birds of the Philippines
Fauna of the Visayas
Birds of Mindanao
dimorphic dwarf kingfisher
dimorphic dwarf kingfisher